Het Nationale Theater (HNT) (English: The National Theater) is the main theater company of The Hague in the Netherlands.

Eric de Vroedt is artistic leader of the theater company.

These three organizations worked together for several years under the name Toneelalliantie (English: Theatric Alliance), mostly active in The Hague.

Het Nationale Theater produces and presents classic plays, modern drama and actuality based programs, as well as cabaret, dance and music theater. The company is in 2018 one of the eight major theater companies subsidized by the national government and produces both for adults and youngsters (through NTjong). It is the largest traveling theater company from the Netherlands, although the Koninklijke Schouwburg and Theater aan het Spui function as its main locations.

Actors 
Het Nationale Theater has an ensemble of actors as employees, which consisted in 2017-2018 of:

 Saman Amini
 Jappe Claes
 Bram Coopmans
 Tamar van den Dop
 Sallie Harmsen
 Hein van der Heijden
 Hannah Hoekstra
 Antoinette Jelgersma
 Werner Kolf
 Vincent Linthorst
 Anniek Pheifer
 Mark Rietman
 Betty Schuurman
 Pieter van der Sman
 Joris Smit
 Jaap Spijkers
 Bram Suijker
 Romana Vrede
 Stefan de Walle
 Emmanuel Ohene Boafo

External links

References 

Culture in The Hague